Kierz may refer to the following places:
Kierz, Kuyavian-Pomeranian Voivodeship (north-central Poland)
Kierz, Łódź Voivodeship (central Poland)
Kierz, Lublin Voivodeship (east Poland)
Kierz, Masovian Voivodeship (east-central Poland)
Kierz, Warmian-Masurian Voivodeship (north Poland)